Snake Gully with Dad 'N' Dave is a Seven Network 1972 television series, comprising 13-episodes based on characters created by Steele Rudd.

It was adapted from the radio series Dad and Dave from Snake Gully rather than Rudd's original stories, and although originally titled simply as "Dad 'N' Dave, this title could not be used due to a copyright, the Snake Gully of the title referring to the fictional town in where the Rudd's resided on a farm.

The series featured an instrumental version of "The Road to Gundagai" as its theme, a vocal version of same had been the theme of the radio series before it.

The network had constructed 8 in-house sets with exterior scenes filmed in and around Riverstone and Windsor, New South Wales.

The series was created and produced by Ralph Peterson, who also wrote some of the scripts, he had worked on the sitcom My Name's McGooley, What's Yours? and cast Gordon Chater in the role of Dad Dan Rudd, with his son Dave played by Garry McDonald. The cast also included Marion Edwards as Mum Sarah Rudd, Robert McDarra as neighbour Bill Smith and his daughter Mabel played by Micelle Fawdon, the series was rounded out with supporting players John Armstrong as Uncle Clarence and Buster Fiddess as Ted Hamilton.

After the pilot, a regular series was commissioned and filmed in color but Fiddess had died, so he was replaced in the role by Noel Ferrier, Armstrong was replaced by Harry Lawrence and as Fawdon had been cast in a production of Jesus Christ Superstar, she to was replaced by actress Diane Craig, another actor to feature in the series as the Mayor was Redmond Phillips.

The series was not popular with both viewers and critics alike and was cancelled. Though the series was unsuccessful, writer Peterson did win an AWGIE award for writing of an episode.

References

External links

Australian television sitcoms
1972 Australian television series debuts
Seven Network original programming